Francisco Javier Estrada Aguirre (born 20 January 1993) is a Mexican professional footballer who plays as a midfielder.

References

External links

1993 births
Living people
People from Ecatepec de Morelos
Footballers from the State of Mexico
Atlante F.C. footballers
Alebrijes de Oaxaca players
Liga MX players
Association football midfielders
Mexican footballers